is the 37th single by Japanese singer/songwriter Chisato Moritaka. Written by Moritaka and Yuichi Takahashi, the single was released by zetima on October 1, 1998. The song was used as an image song for NTV's booth at the 1998 Museum of Fine Arts Exhibition at the Musée de l'Orangerie in Paris to commemorate the network's 45th anniversary.

Chart performance 
"Tsumetai Tsuki" peaked at No. 33 on Oricon's singles chart and sold 14,000 copies.

Other versions 
Moritaka re-recorded the song and uploaded the video on her YouTube channel on May 31, 2013. This version is also included in Moritaka's 2013 self-covers DVD album Love Vol. 4.

Track listing

Personnel 
 Chisato Moritaka – vocals, drums
 Yuichi Takahashi – acoustic guitar, synthesizer programming, piano
 Yasuaki Maejima – piano, Fender Rhodes
 Yukio Seto – acoustic guitar, bass, percussion

Chart positions

References

External links 
 
 
 

1998 singles
1998 songs
Japanese-language songs
Chisato Moritaka songs
Songs with lyrics by Chisato Moritaka
Zetima Records singles